WEVR may refer to:

 WEVR (AM), a radio station (1550 AM) licensed to River Falls, Wisconsin, United States
 WEVR-FM, a radio station (106.3 FM) licensed to River Falls, Wisconsin, United States